Nita Englund (born 10 June 1992 in Iron Mountain) is an American ski jumper.

She is a member of the United States Ski Team, and participated at the 2018 Winter Olympics.

Life 
Englund grew up in Florence, Wisconsin. She graduated from Academy of Art University.

In 2014, she placed third at the FIS Cup in Frenštát pod Radhoštěm.

References

External links 
 
 
 
 

American female ski jumpers
1992 births
Living people
Ski jumpers at the 2018 Winter Olympics
Olympic ski jumpers of the United States
21st-century American women